High Falls may refer to:

 High Falls (DuPont State Forest), a waterfall on the Little River in North Carolina, United States
 High Falls (Rochester, New York), a waterfall on the Genesee River in Rochester, New York, United States
 High Falls, New York, United States, a hamlet
 High Falls, Ontario, Canada, a ghost town near Walden
 High Falls Brewing Company, the former name of Genesee Brewing Company, a brewery in Rochester, New York, United States
 High Falls on the Oswegatchie River, a waterfall on the Oswegatchie River in New York, United States
 High Falls State Park in Georgia, United States
 The High Falls of the Baptism River in Tettegouche State Park, Minnesota, United States
 The High Falls of the Pigeon River in Grand Portage State Park, Minnesota, United States